The follow articles comprise the glossary of education-related terms:

 Glossary of education terms (A–C)
 Glossary of education terms (D–F)
 Glossary of education terms (G–L)
 Glossary of education terms (M–O)
 Glossary of education terms (P–R)
 Glossary of education terms (S)
 Glossary of education terms (T–Z)